North Hertfordshire is one of ten local government districts in the county of Hertfordshire, England. Its council is based in Letchworth. The district borders East Hertfordshire, Stevenage, Welwyn Hatfield, St Albans, Central Bedfordshire, Luton, and South Cambridgeshire.

History
North Hertfordshire was created on 1 April 1974 under the Local Government Act 1972, covering the area of five former districts, which were all abolished at the same time:
Baldock Urban District
Hitchin Urban District
Hitchin Rural District
Letchworth Urban District
Royston Urban District

The new district was named North Hertfordshire, reflecting its position within the wider county. Hertfordshire has a two-tier structure of local government, with the ten district councils (including North Hertfordshire District Council) providing district-level services, and Hertfordshire County Council providing county-level services.

Governance

Political control
The first election to North Hertfordshire District Council was held in 1973, initially operating as a shadow authority alongside the outgoing authorities until the new system came into force on 1 April 1974. Political control since 1974 has been as follows:

Leadership
The leaders of the council since 1974 (formally the chair of the policy and resources committee prior to the Local Government Act 2000) have been:

Composition

The council consists of 49 elected members, representing twenty-four wards. The council has been under no overall control since 2019, being run by a Labour and Liberal Democrats joint administration. In the 2021 council elections Labour lost the Letchworth Grange seat to the Conservative party. A total of 17 seats out of the 49 of the council were contested, including two by-elections. The 16 other seats were held by the incumbent party. In the 2022 council elections, the Conservatives lost two seats to the Liberal Democrats, being Letchworth South West and Hitchin Priory, as well as losing a further two seats to Labour, being Royston Palace and Baldock Town.

Premises
When the council was created in 1974, it inherited five sets of offices from the five former authorities, spread across the four towns of Hitchin, Letchworth, Baldock and Royston. Initially the new council used the former Hitchin Rural District Council's offices (later called Centenary House) on Grammar School Walk in Hitchin as its headquarters, with the other offices providing additional accommodation. In 1975, the year after the new council's creation, it consolidated most of its functions into a new six-storey building called Council Offices on Gernon Road in Letchworth.  The council rented the building until 2013, when it purchased it for £3.6 million.

Towns and Parishes
North Hertfordshire contains four towns, being Baldock, Hitchin, Letchworth, and Royston. The district also borders the northern, western and southern edges of Stevenage, and some parts of the latter's urban area lie within North Hertfordshire rather than the borough of Stevenage, notably including much of the Great Ashby area.

North Hertfordshire contains 35 civil parishes. Six of the smaller parishes do not have parish councils, having instead a parish meeting, being those marked with asterisks(*) below. In addition, the three towns of Baldock, Hitchin, and Letchworth are unparished areas, as no successor parishes were created for those three former urban districts on their abolition in 1974. A Letchworth Garden City Parish was subsequently created in 2005, but was abolished in 2013.

Ashwell
Barley
Barkway
Bygrave
Caldecote
Clothall*
Codicote
Graveley
Great Ashby
Hexton*
Hinxworth
Holwell
Ickleford
Kelshall*
Kimpton
Kings Walden
Knebworth
Langley*
Lilley
Newnham
Nuthampstead*
Offley
Pirton
Preston
Radwell*
Reed
Royston
Rushden
Sandon
St Ippolyts
St Paul's Walden
Therfield
Wallington
Weston
Wymondley

Wards
North Hertfordshire is divided into 24 wards, electing one, two or three councillors.

 Arbury (1)
 Baldock East (1)
 Baldock Town (3)
 Cadwell (1)
 Chesfield (2)
 Codicote (1)
 Ermine (1)
 Hitchin Bearton (3)
 Hitchin Highbury (3)
 Hitchin Oughton (2)
 Hitchin Priory (2)
 Hitchin Walsworth (3)
 Hitchwood, Offa and Hoo (3)
 Kimpton (1)
 Knebworth (2)
 Letchworth East (2)
 Letchworth Grange (3)
 Letchworth South East (3)
 Letchworth South West (3)
 Letchworth Wilbury (2)
 Royston Heath (2)
 Royston Meridian (2)
 Royston Palace (2)
 Weston and Sandon (1)

Arms

Logo

In 2021 the council adopted a new logo of four hearts (shown in the infobox above) and the style "North Herts Council" instead of its full formal name of "North Hertfordshire District Council". Prior to this, the council had used a logo of the initials "NHDC" in a green and purple square for approximately thirty years.

References 

 
Districts of Hertfordshire